Isaiah D'Vaughn Pead (born December 14, 1989) is a former American football running back. He played college football at Cincinnati. Pead was drafted by the St. Louis Rams in the second round of the 2012 NFL Draft. He was also a member of the Pittsburgh Steelers and Miami Dolphins.

Early years
Pead attended Eastmoor in Columbus, Ohio, where he was a letterman in football and track. In football, he was a four-year letterwinner at running back and defensive back. He rushed for 1,696 yards (10.7 yards per carry) and 24 touchdowns, and also caught 10 passes for 250 yards, including two scores on his way to being named Ohio's Division IV Player of the Year in 2006. He earned the Ohio Division III Player of the Year award after rushing for 2,204 yards (11.5 yards per carry) and scored 39 touchdowns as a senior. He concluded his prep career with 4,443 rushing yards and 63 touchdowns. He is Eastmoor Academy's all-time rushing leader, surpassing two-time Heisman Trophy Winner Archie Griffin.

In track & field, Pead was one of the state's top performers in the sprinting events. He was the 2007 Ohio Division II State 400-meter dash champion, with a PR of 48.16 seconds. He took gold in the 100 meters at the 2008 Eastmoor Academy Invitational, recording a personal-best time of 10.89 seconds. He also ran the 200 meters in 22.05 seconds.

College career
Pead attended the University of Cincinnati from 2008 to 2011. He finished his career with 3,288 rushing yards on 545 carries with 27 touchdowns.

As a senior in 2011, Pead was the MVP of the 2012 Senior Bowl.

Professional career

Pead was considered one of the top running back prospects for the 2012 NFL Draft. He was drafted in the second round, 50th overall by the St. Louis Rams.

St. Louis Rams
On May 31, 2013, the NFL announced that Pead would be suspended for the  season opener for violating the substance abuse policy.

During the Rams' second preseason game against the Green Bay Packers in 2014, Pead tore his ACL on a kickoff return. He was placed on IR a few days later.

Pittsburgh Steelers
Pead was signed by the Pittsburgh Steelers on November 2, 2015, after Le'Veon Bell was placed on season-ending injured reserve with an MCL tear. On November 27, 2015, Pead was released by the Steelers.

Miami Dolphins
On March 31, 2016, Pead signed with the Miami Dolphins. On October 11, 2016, he was released by the Dolphins.

Statistics
Source: NFL.com

Car crash and personal life
On November 12, 2016, at approximately 2:30 AM, Pead was involved in a serious car crash, in which he was not wearing a seatbelt.

According to the Columbus Division of Police, at about 2:32am, Saturday, Pead was driving his 2011 Cadillac CTS eastbound on I-670 near E. 5th Avenue, when he lost control of the vehicle, and drove off the right side of the roadway. The Cadillac struck the metal guardrail and continued through it. After going through the guardrail the Cadillac became airborne and struck several trees on the way down the embankment. It came to rest about 95 feet from the roadway.

Police said two witnesses stopped and called 911 and provided assistance to Pead and a passenger in the Cadillac, Wesley Richardson, 27, until police arrived at the crash scene.

Pead was taken to Grant Medical Center and had emergency surgery. Pead's injuries were career-ending. Cincinnati football coach, Tommy Tuberville, said Pead lost his left leg in the accident.

Pead reportedly started a trucking company and has one son.

References

External links
 
 Cincinnati Bearcats bio

1989 births
Living people
American football running backs
American amputees
Sportspeople with limb difference
Cincinnati Bearcats football players
Miami Dolphins players
Pittsburgh Steelers players
Players of American football from Columbus, Ohio
St. Louis Rams players